Model Airplane News is a monthly magazine focusing upon the hobby of radio control airplanes. Model Airplane News reviews radio control aircraft from backyard flyers, to giant scale airplanes, and features  how-to articles, product reviews, modeling technology, and construction projects.

History and profile
Model Airplane News was launched in 1929 in the United States by Air Age Media Inc. The magazine is based in Wilton, Connecticut.

Editors
Charles Hampson Grant 
Andy Lennon, former contributing editor

References

Further reading
  Quote (from Google search summary): "Tyskewicz will defend his record In New York at a national model plane meet to be held June 25 under the auspices of the Universal Model Airplane News."

External links
 
 Digitized Issues at the Internet Archive

Magazines established in 1929
Model aircraft
Radio control
Radio-controlled aircraft
Hobby magazines published in the United States
Aviation magazines
Business magazines published in the United States
Monthly magazines published in the United States
Magazines published in Connecticut